The Essential Bruce Springsteen is a compilation album by Bruce Springsteen, released on November 11, 2003. The collection is part of a series of Essential sets released by Sony BMG (previously Sony Music Entertainment). It includes songs from various Springsteen albums and concerts up to the year 2003. A limited-edition third disc includes previously unreleased cuts, B-sides, contributions to soundtracks and benefit albums, covers, and an alternate, "country-blues" acoustic version of "Countin' on a Miracle" from The Rising.

The album debuted on the Billboard 200 albums chart on November 29, 2003, at No. 14, with sales of 90,000 copies. The album was awarded gold and platinum records on December 16, 2003, by the RIAA. As of August 2013, the album has sold over 1,079,000 copies in the United States. It reached No. 15 on the UK Albums Chart in 2013. The album was re-released with an updated track listing in October 2015.

Critical reception

The album received general acclaim from music critics, who appreciated its inclusion of Springsteen's most recognizable hits throughout his career. AllMusic calls it a better compilation album than 1995's "misguided, haphazardly selected" Greatest Hits.

Track listings

2003 bonus disc

Charts

Certifications

References

External links
 Album contents
 Album credits

2003 compilation albums
Bruce Springsteen compilation albums
Columbia Records compilation albums
2003 greatest hits albums